Al Muntazir School, named after the Shia Twelfth Imam, is a collection of non-government schools, providing education from pre-school to A-levels, in Dar es Salaam, Tanzania.
It was founded and is run by the Shia Ithna'sheri Jamaat, Central Board of Education (CBE).
The Al Muntazir School spreads across various campuses on 3 different locations:
Al Muntazir Secondary located on United Nations Road, Dar es Salaam
Al Muntazir Boys Primary located on Sea View Road, Dar es Salaam
Al Muntazir Girls Primary located on United Nations Road, Dar es Salaam
Al Muntazir Nursery located on Kipalapala Road, Dar es Salaam
Al Muntazir Special Education Needs, located on Charambe Street, Dar es Salaam

Al Muntazir Secondary
Established in 1986, the school is home to approximately 1000+ students and 80+ teaching faculty, and offers the Cambridge Assessment International Education (CAIE) Curriculum from Lower Secondary to A Level.

Curriculum
Al Muntazir Secondary is authorized by the Cambridge Assessment International Education  (CAIE – UK) to offer the Cambridge Lower Secondary, Cambridge IGCSE and Cambridge GCE A Level programs for ages 12 – 18.

Secondary School uses Cambridge Lower Secondary, IGCSE and GCE A Level.

Years 7 to 9 (Lower Secondary)

Year 10 & 11 (IGCSE)

Year 12 & 13 (Post 16 – A levels

Extracurricular Activities
Students are currently registered for clubs such as
Mathematics Club
Badminton
Editorial club
Kiswahili Club
Farsi Club
Table tennis 
Model United Nations (MUN)
Kickboxing
Environmental Club
Young scientists club
Community service
Swimming
Basketball club
Throwball
Cooking club
Football club
Cricket club

Facilities
School Library:2 libraries are available(1 per wing)

Science Laboratories:
A total of six science labs are available(3 per wing)

IT Laboratories:
Two IT Labs are available(1 per wing)

Sports Ground
The school has access to the Union Sports Club Sports ground for sporting activities such as football, volleyball, cricket, squash, and swimming

Al Muntazir Boys Primary 
The Al Muntazir Boys Primary, formerly known as Al Muntazir Junior School, is situated on Sea View Road opposite the Aga Khan Hospital. It currently follows the 6 year program on Cambridge Primary Curriculum.

Extracurricular Activities
Students can enroll in clubs such as
Quiz Club
Bookworm Club
Board Games: Scrabble, Math fun, etc.
Kiswahili Drama Club
Mathematics
Qur'an Hifz/Arabic
Arts and crafts (knitting, drawing, etc.)
Environmental Club
Young Journalist Club

Sporting activities available are; Basketball&Karate

Al Muntazir Girls Primary 
Al Muntazir Girls Primary is situated on the United Nations Road, next to the Selandar Bridge. The campus was established in 2002, branching out from the Al Muntazir Junior School as a two-floored open rectangle. It consists of offices and classrooms, as well as extra facilities such as an art room, a library, a computer room, a moral science room, a resource room, and a sick bay where children are taken care of by the school nurse. The curriculum offered is Cambridge Primary.

Al Muntazir Nursery 
It currently offers Early Years Foundation Stage (EYFS) program, supporting children's development from

See also
Dar es Salaam

References

Private schools in Tanzania
Cambridge schools in Tanzania
Islamic schools in Tanzania
Education in Dar es Salaam
Shia Islam in Africa